Act II: The Meaning of, and All Things Regarding Ms. Leading is the second studio album by American progressive rock band The Dear Hunter, released on May 22, 2007 through Triple Crown Records.

The album is the second part of a six-act story. Act II begins with the death of the innominate main character's mother, Ms. Terri. Following her death, he travels to a nearby brothel in the hopes of learning more about his mother and the life she lived as a prostitute, as he himself was the product of her profession. He eventually finds love in a prostitute named Ms. Leading, but the relationship eventually falls apart due to his inability to cope with her chosen profession.

According to an interview with Casey Crescenzo for music website AbsolutePunk, the band wrote 120 minutes' worth of music for the album, but managed to trim it down to just under 80 minutes to avoid having to do a double-disc release.

The album features numerous re-recorded tracks from the Dear Ms. Leading demos. Although Casey based much of the demo's lyrics on personal experiences, he has stated that the arc of falling in love with a prostitute is not based on any experience he's actually had.

In June 2007, artist Kent St. John was selected to illustrate a book based on the story of Act II. The progress of his contributions can be seen at his personal blog.

Track listing

 Track 9 and tracks 11–14 originally appeared on Dear Ms. Leading.

Personnel

 Casey Crescenzo – Vocals, Guitar, Bass, Keyboards, Organ
 Luke Dent – Piano, Organ, Vocals
 Sam Dent – Drums, Percussion, Glockenspiel
 Erick Serna – Acoustic and Electric Guitar

Additional personnel

 Phil Crescenzo – Banjo
 Matt Tobin – Violin
 Philip Wolf – Cello
 Jason Belcher – Trumpet, French horn
 Krysten Keches – Harp
 Brandon Brooks – Cello

References

2007 albums
The Dear Hunter albums
Concept albums
Rock operas
Triple Crown Records albums
Sequel albums